Thaida chepu is a species of spider in the family Austrochilidae, found in Chile.

References

Austrochilidae
Spiders of South America
Spiders described in 1987
Endemic fauna of Chile